The Baiuvarii, Bavarii, or Bavarians were a Germanic people. The Baiuvarii had settled in modern-day Bavaria (which is named after them), Austria, and South Tyrol by the 6th century AD, and are considered to be the ancestors of modern-day Bavarians and Austrians. It is believed that they spoke an early version of the Bavarian language.

Name
The name of the Baiuvarii is also spelled Baiuvari. It probably means "men from Bohemia". The placename Bohemia is believed to be connected to that of the Boii, a Celtic people who left the region before the Roman era and were replaced by Germanic peoples. The Baiuvarii gave their name to the region of Bavaria.

Language
The Baiuvarii are classified as a Germanic people. It is uncertain whether they originally spoke an East Germanic or West Germanic language. Early evidence on the language of the Baiuvarii is limited to personal names and a few Runic inscriptions. By the 8th century AD, the Baiuvarii were speakers of an early form of the Austro-Bavarian language within the West Germanic family.

History
The name is first attested in Latin sources in the 6th century AD. 
Notably, the early 6th century biography of Severinus of Noricum describes the region without mentioning them. 
One of the earliest references to the Baiuvarii is the Frankish Table of Nations from about 520, which describes them as a people with kinship to the Burgundians, Thuringians and Lombards. 
In his Getica (551), Jordanes wrote that the Suebes people under the rule of the 5th century Hunimund had lived across the Danube from Dalmatia and Pannonia with the Franks on their west, Thuringians to their north, and Burgundians to their south, and the Baibaros to their east, who may have been the Bavarians.
In a poem about a pilgrimage to Augsburg in 565, Venantius Fortunatus mentions the land Baioaria on the river Lech, which north flows from the Austrian alps to the German Danube. They were between the Allemanni on the Danube and the Breones who were based near the river Inn.

Evidence from the etymology of their name implies that the Baiuvarii, being named after Bohemia, can not have existed under that name before the 1st century AD. During this period Maroboduus, king of the Germanic Marcomanni, lead his people into their area which had previously been inhabited by the Celtic Boii. Whether the Baiuvarii settled Bavaria in a specific later migration, after Maroboduus, either from the north (Bohemia) or from Pannonia, is uncertain.

According to Karl Bosl, Bavarian migration to present-day Bavaria is a legend. The early Baiuvarii are often associated with the Friedenhain-Přešťovice archaeological group, but this is controversial. During the time of Attila in the 5th century, the entire Middle Danube region saw the entry of many new peoples from north and east of the Carpathians, and the formation and destruction of many new political entities.

It is thus more probable that the Baiuvarii emerged in the provinces of Noricum ripense and Raetia secunda following Odoacer's withdrawal of population to Italy in 488, and the subsequent expansion of Italian Ostrogothic, and Merovingian Frankish influence into the area. They are believed to have incorporated elements from several Germanic peoples, including the Sciri, Heruli, Suebi, Alemanni, Naristi, Thuringi and Lombards. They might also have included non-Germanic Romance people.

The region was under the influence of the Ostrogothic Kingdom of Theodoric the Great. During this period, the Frankish king Theudebert I (died 548) claimed control from the North Sea to Pannonia. After his death, his uncle Chlothar I appointed Garibald I as dux of Bavaria. He established the Agilolfings dynasty with his power base at Augsburg or Regensburg. By the 8th century, many Baiuvarii had converted to Christianity.

Through their ruling Agilolfings dynasty, they were closely connected with the Franks.

Culture
A collection of Bavarian tribal laws was compiled in the 8th century. This document is known as Lex Baiuvariorum. Elements of it possibly date back to the 6th century. It is very similar to Lex Thuringorum, which was the legal code of the Thuringi, with whom the Baiuvarii had close relations.

The funerary traditions of the Baiuvarii are similar to those of the Alemanni, but quite different from those of the Thuringi. The Baiuvarii are distinguished by the presence of individuals with artificially deformed craniums in their cemeteries. Although, these individuals were predominantly female, only found in small numbers, and they did not leave a genetic impact upon the Bavarian people. Likewise, they were determined to have mostly come from southeastern Europe, perhaps as a form of exogamy.

Genetics

A genetic study published in the Proceedings of the National Academy of Sciences of the United States of America in 2018 examined the remains of 41 individuals buried at a Bavarian cemetery ca. 500 AD. Of these, 11 whole genomes were generated. The males were found to be genetically homogeneous and of north-central European origin. The females were less homogeneous, particularly those with artificially deformed craniums. The majority of the surveyed individuals, particularly the males, were predicted to have had blond hair and blue eyes. No significant admixture with Roman populations from territories further south of the area was detected. Among modern populations, the surveyed individuals were found to be most closely related to modern-day Germans.

See also
 Austrians
 Bavarians
 Elbe Germanic peoples
 Irminones

References

Sources

Further reading

External links
 

 
Early Germanic peoples
German tribes
History of Altbayern